Daniel J. "Dan" Kim is the founder and former Chief Executive Officer of Red Mango, an American frozen yogurt and smoothie chain. Currently, Kim serves as Director, Airbnb Plus at Airbnb. Previously, Kim held the position of Head of Global Sales, Marketing and Delivery for Tesla, and served as Chief of Staff and Chief Marketing Officer for Solera Holdings, a Dallas, Texas-based software and technology company.

Early life
Kim was born in Seoul, South Korea, and moved to the U.S. with his parents soon after. He grew up in southern California. After working as an investment banker with Donaldson, Lufkin & Jenrette and as a financial analyst with Deloitte, he held jobs for a number of startups, including Stamps.com.

Red Mango
In 2007, Kim opened the first Red Mango in Los Angeles, California near UCLA's campus.  Red Mango expanded to 100 locations in the next three years. Kim said that his three primary goals with Red Mango were to "get people to try the product, get them to know it’s good for them and give them a great in-store experience."

Prior to departing from Red Mango in 2015, Kim served as Red Mango’s Chief Concept Officer and founder.

Awards and recognition
He was also named “Entrepreneur of the Month” for January 2010 by Restaurant Business Magazine.

References

External links
Bearing fruit - How Dan Kim drives Red Mango forward with a razor-sharp brand strategy (an interview with Smart Business)
Daniel Kim interview with Japan Cinema
Grab a Spoon (an interview with KoreAm Journal)

American people of Korean descent
American chief executives of food industry companies
Fast-food chain founders
Living people
American financial analysts
American food company founders
American investment bankers
Year of birth missing (living people)